Bryony Elisabeth Shaw (born 28 April 1983, Wandsworth) is a British Olympic windsurfer.

Early life
She first began windsurfing in the south of France in 1992. She attended Cheney Upper School near Headington in Oxford (where her father had been teaching at Oxford Brookes University), gaining A levels in art, maths, and biology. She had windsurfed on Farmoor Reservoir to the west of Oxford. She went to Cardiff University to study architecture, and she stayed for a year before committing to windsurfing full time in 2005.

Windsurfing
She won the bronze medal in the women's RS:X class at the 2008 Summer Olympics, the first ever women's windsurfing medal for the British Olympic team. She trains at the Weymouth and Portland National Sailing Academy.

Shaw won silver at the 2013, 2015, and 2016 RS:X World Championships, and 5th at the 2014 ISAF Sailing World Championships.

2008 Summer Olympic regatta

See also
 Nick Dempsey, another Olympic windsurfer from Weymouth

References

External links
 
 
 
 
 Team GB profile
 RYA profile
 Guardian July 2008
 Gold at Skandia Sail for Gold Regatta in September 2007
 

English female sailors (sport)
English windsurfers
Olympic bronze medallists for Great Britain
Olympic sailors of Great Britain
Sailors at the 2008 Summer Olympics – RS:X
Sailors at the 2012 Summer Olympics – RS:X
Sailors at the 2016 Summer Olympics – RS:X
Living people
1983 births
Alumni of Cardiff University
Olympic medalists in sailing
Medalists at the 2008 Summer Olympics
People educated at Cheney School
Sportspeople from Weymouth
Female windsurfers